Percival Sizara (born 24 November 1988) is a Zimbabwean cricket umpire. He has stood in matches in the 2020–21 Logan Cup and the 2017–18 Pro50 Championship tournaments. He also stood in 2021 Zimbabwe Domestic Twenty20 Competition.

He umpired his first international match in 2021, in the ODI series between Zimbabwe women and Bangladesh women.

References

External links
 
 

1988 births
Living people
Zimbabwean cricket umpires
Sportspeople from Harare